Sepak takraw at the 2017 Southeast Asian Games was held in Titiwangsa Indoor Stadium, Kuala Lumpur from 16 to 29 August 2017.

Chinlone which was introduced at the 2013 SEA Games in Myanmar was subsumed under the sport of Sepak Takraw here at the 2017 Southeast Asian Games. Only 4 Chinlone events competed by men were held.

Participating nations

Competition schedule
The following is the competition schedule for the sepak takraw competitions:

Medalists

Sepak takraw

Chinlone

Medal table

References